Germany Township is a township in Adams County, Pennsylvania, United States. The population was 2,844 at the 2020 census. The majority of early settlers were from Germany and Great Britain.

Geography
Germany Township is in southern Adams County, along the Maryland border. It borders the western and southern sides of the borough of Littlestown. Pennsylvania Route 97 passes through the township, leading northwest  to Gettysburg and south  as Maryland Route 97 to Westminster. Pennsylvania Route 194 crosses Route 97 in Littlestown and passes through the township, becoming Maryland Route 194 and leading southwest  to Taneytown.

Demographics
As of the census of 2000, there were 2,269 people, 773 households, and 660 families residing in the township.  The population density was 207.8 people per square mile (80.2/km).  There were 788 housing units at an average density of 72.2/sq mi (27.9/km).  The racial makeup of the township was 98.81% White, 0.18% African American, 0.09% Native American, 0.35% Asian, 0.04% Pacific Islander, 0.09% from other races, and 0.44% from two or more races. Hispanic or Latino of any race were 0.53% of the population.

There were 773 households, out of which 40.6% had children under the age of 18 living with them, 72.4% were married couples living together, 8.0% had a female householder with no husband present, and 14.6% were non-families. 11.9% of all households were made up of individuals, and 6.1% had someone living alone who was 65 years of age or older.  The average household size was 2.93 and the average family size was 3.16.

In the township the population was spread out, with 28.3% under the age of 18, 6.7% from 18 to 24, 29.2% from 25 to 44, 24.0% from 45 to 64, and 11.9% who were 65 years of age or older.  The median age was 37 years. For every 100 females, there were 98.3 males.  For every 100 females age 18 and over, there were 98.9 males.

The median income for a household in the township was $46,806, and the median income for a family was $50,484. Males had a median income of $33,409 versus $24,274 for females. The per capita income for the township was $17,636.  About 4.2% of families and 6.5% of the population were below the poverty line, including 8.9% of those under age 18 and 2.5% of those age 65 or over.

References

External links

Germany Township official website

Populated places established in 1733
Townships in Adams County, Pennsylvania
Townships in Pennsylvania